Celis may refer to :

Celis, Spain, a town in Cantabria, Spain
Celis (beer), a Texas-based beer brand

People
Celis Pérez (1939-2008), birth name of Argentine artist Pérez Celis

Surname
Alfonso Celis Jr., Mexican race driver
Eduardo Martínez Celis (1890–1943), Mexican journalist, author
Eulogio F. de Celis, American landowner and newspaper publisher
Félix Celis, Belgian photographer of 1910s
Guillermo Celis (born 1993), Colombian footballer
Gustavo Celis, American music engineer, mixer and producer
Johanna Ismael Celis, better known as Kiráy, Filipina actress
Matías Celis (born 1989), Chilean footballer 
Mely Romero Celis, Mexican politician
Nicolás Celis (born 1984), Peruvian footballer
Pedro Celis, American software engineer
Pérez Celis, Argentinian artist
Pierre Celis (1925–2011), Belgian brewer
Ricardo Celis, Mexican sportscaster
Sancho Dávila y Fernández de Celis (1905–1972), Spanish politician
Santiago José Celis (1782-1814), Salvadoran physician and activist
Stijn Celis, Belgian choreographer
Vera Celis (born 1959), Belgian politician

See also
Celes (disambiguation)
Celi (disambiguation)